The Clydesdale Bank £5 note, also known informally as a fiver, is a sterling banknote. It is the smallest denomination of banknote issued by the Clydesdale Bank. The current polymer note, first issued in 2015, bears an image of engineer William Arrol on the obverse and an image of the Forth Bridge on the reverse. It is the first fully polymer banknote to go into circulation in the United Kingdom.

History
The Clydesdale Bank began issuing £5 notes in 1838, the same year as the bank's founding. Early banknotes were monochrome, and printed on one side only. The issuing of banknotes by Scottish banks was regulated by the Banknote (Scotland) Act 1845 until it was superseded by the Banking Act 2009. Though strictly not legal tender in Scotland, Scottish banknotes are nevertheless legal currency and are generally accepted throughout the United Kingdom. Scottish banknotes are fully backed such that holders have the same level of protection as those holding genuine Bank of England notes. The £5 note is currently the smallest denomination of banknote issued by the Clydesdale Bank.

Scottish banknotes are not withdrawn in the same manner as Bank of England notes, and therefore several different versions of the Clydesdale five pound note may be encountered, although the Committee of Scottish Bankers encouraged the public to spend or exchange older, non-polymer five pound notes before 1 March 2018. The "Famous Scots" issue of the £5 note featuring Scottish poet Robert Burns was introduced in 1971. On the reverse are images of a field mouse and wild roses, inspired by two of Burns' poems. A "World Heritage" series £5 note was introduced in 2009. This note features a portrait of biologist Alexander Fleming on the front, and an image of the World Heritage Site of St Kilda on the back. In 2015 a new polymer note was introduced, featuring an image of the Forth Bridge on the reverse and a portrait of William Arrol, whose firm constructed the bridge, on the obverse. This note was the first British banknote to be made entirely from polymer.

Designs

Information taken from The Committee of Scottish Bankers website.

References

External links

The Committee of Scottish Bankers website

Banknotes of Scotland
Five-base-unit banknotes
Clydesdale Bank